Plöwen is a municipality in the Vorpommern-Greifswald district, in Mecklenburg-Vorpommern, Germany. It has a population of 292.

References

Vorpommern-Greifswald